Squash competition at the 2014 Asian Beach Games was held in Karon Beach, Phuket, Thailand from 13 to 16 November 2014.

Medalists

Medal table

Results

Men's singles

Women's singles

References 

Men's Results
Women's Results

External links 
 

2014 Asian Beach Games events
Asian Games
2014 Asian Beach Games